Zelenyi Hai is a village in Rovenky Raion, Luhansk Oblast, Ukraine.

Villages in Rovenky Raion